Greenishmay be:

 Shades of green
 Simon Greenish, MBE, a British Chartered Civil Engineer and Director of Bletchley Park

See also
 Greenish-backed oriole, a species of bird in the family Oriolidae
 Greenish bladder-fern, a fern in the family Cystopteridaceae
 Greenish chestnut moth, a moth in the family Tortricidae
 Greenish darter, a butterfly in the family Hesperiidae
 Greenish elaenia, a species of bird in the family Tyrannidae, the tyrant flycatchers
 Greenish grass-dart, a species of butterfly in the family Hesperiidae, known as a skipper 
 Greenish mountain blue, a butterfly in the family Lycaenidae
 Greenish naked-backed fruit bat, a species of megabat in the family Pteropodidae
 Greenish puffleg, a species of hummingbird in the family Trochilidae
 Greenish schiffornis, also greenish mourner or greenish manakin, a species of bird in the family Tityridae
 Greenish star, a white or blue star that appears green due to an optical illusion
 Greenish tyrannulet, a species of bird in the family Tyrannidae
 Greenish warbler, a widespread leaf warbler species of bird in the family Phylloscopidae
 Greenish yellow bat, a species of vesper bat in the family Vespertilionidae
 Greenish yellow finch, a species of bird in the family Thraupidae
 The Greenish Bird, a Mexican fairy tale collected by Joel Gomez in La Encantada, Texas, United States